Bangiya Gramin Vikash Bank (BGVB) is an Indian Regional Rural Bank established as a Gramin bank in terms of provisions of Regional Rural Banks Act 1976. It is under the ownership of Ministry of Finance, Government of India.

The Bank operates in 12 districts (after creation of Jhargram District) of West Bengal State with its Head Office at Baharampur, Murshidabad, West Bengal. It has 587 Branches within its commanding area.

History
BGVB was established with the amalgamation of Mallabhum Gramin Bank, Gaur Gramin Bank, Murshidabad Gramin Bank, Nadia Gramin Bank and Sagar Gramin Bank in 2007.

Area of operations
The Bank is operating in 12 districts of West Bengal State. They are:
 Uttar Dinajpur district
 Dakshin Dinajpur district
 Malda district
 Murshidabad district
 Nadia district
 North 24 Parganas district
 South 24 Parganas district
 Purba Medinipur
 Paschim Medinipur
 Bankura District
 Purulia district
 Jhargram district

See also

 Banking in India
 List of banks in India
 Reserve Bank of India
 Regional Rural Bank
 Indian Financial System Code
 List of largest banks
 List of companies of India
 Make in India

References

Regional rural banks of India
Companies based in West Bengal
2007 establishments in West Bengal
Banks established in 2007
Indian companies established in 2007